This is a list of settlements in Argolis, Greece.

 Achladokampos
 Adami
 Agia Triada
 Agios Adrianos
 Agios Dimitrios
 Agios Nikolaos
 Alea
 Andritsa
 Anyfi
 Arachnaio
 Archaia Epidavros
 Argoliko
 Argos
 Aria
 Arkadiko
 Asini
 Asklipieio
 Borsas
 Dalamanara
 Didyma
 Dimaina
 Drepano
 Elliniko
 Ermioni
 Fichti
 Fournoi
 Fregkaina
 Frousiouna
 Gymno
 Iliokastro
 Inachos
 Ira
 Iraio
 Iria
 Kaparelli
 Karnezaiika
 Karya
 Kefalari
 Kefalovryso
 Kiveri
 Koilada
 Kourtaki
 Koutsopodi
 Kranidi
 Laloukas
 Lefkakia
 Limnes
 Lyrkeia
 Malantreni
 Manesis
 Midea
 Monastiraki
 Mykines
 Myloi
 Nafplio
 Nea Epidavros
 Nea Kios
 Nea Tiryntha
 Neo Iraio
 Neo Roeino
 Neochori
 Panaritis
 Portocheli
 Poullakida
 Prosymna
 Pyrgella
 Pyrgiotika
 Schinochori
 Skafidaki
 Skoteini
 Sterna
 Thermisia
 Tolo
 Tracheia
 Vrousti

By municipality

See also
List of towns and villages in Greece

 
Argolis